Hough is an English surname that is also used in Ireland as a variant of Haugh. People with this surname may pronounce it as "how" or "huff". Notable people with the surname include:

Authors and writers
 Barrie Hough (1953–2004), South African writer
 Charlotte Hough (1924–2008), British author
 David L. Hough (born 1937), American writer on motorcycles
 Donald Hough (1895–c. 1965), American humorist and author
 Emerson Hough (1857–1923), American author
 Graham Hough (1908–1990), English literary critic and poet
 Henry Beetle Hough (1896–1985), American journalist
 Hugh Hough (1924–1986), American author
 Jason M. Hough, author of The Dire Earth Cycle
 Richard Hough (1922–1999), British author and historian
 Robert Hough (born 1963), Canadian author
 Stanley Bennett Hough (1917–1998), British author of science fiction

Entertainers and directors
 Derek Hough (born 1985), American professional dancer, choreographer, actor and singer
 Greg Hough, American musician best known as a founder of the band Petra in 1972
 John Hough (director) (born 1941), British film and television director
 Julianne Hough (born 1988), American dancer, actress, singer and songwriter
 Lotty Hough (1833–1896), American actress and comedian
 Melissa Hough (born c. 1985), American ballet dancer
 Paul Hough (born 1974), English director
 Stan Hough (1918–1990), American movie executive
 Stephen Hough (born 1961), British concert pianist and composer

Military figures
 Daniel Hough (1825–1861), Irish-born American soldier, first casualty of the Civil War
 Henry Hughes Hough (1871–1943), American naval admiral
 Ira Hough (1842–1916), American soldier, medal of honor recipient

Politicians and judges
 Benjamin Hough (1773–1819), American politician in Ohio
 Benson W. Hough (1875–1935), American lawyer and judge
 Charles Merrill Hough (1858–1927), American lawyer and judge
 Danie Hough (1937–2008), South African politician
 David Hough (politician) (1753–1831), American politician in New Hampshire
 Frank Hough (born 1944), Australian politician
 Jack Hough (1916–1971), Australian politician
 Lincoln Hough (born 1982), American politician in Missouri
 Maxine Hough (born 1942), American educator and politician in Wisconsin
 Michael Hough (politician) (born 1979), American politician in Maryland
 Olmstead Hough ((1797–1865), American tradesman and politician in Michigan
 Ralph D. Hough (born 1943), American politician in New Hampshire
 Sue Metzger Dickey Hough (1883-1980), American lawyer, businesswoman, and politician in Minnesota
 Warwick Hough (1836–1915), Justice of the Supreme Court of Missouri
 William J. Hough (1795–1869), American politician in New York

Religious figures
 John Hough (bishop) (1651–1743), English bishop
 Joseph C. Hough Jr., American minister in the United Church of Christ
 Lynn H. Hough (1877–1971), American Methodist clergyman, theologian, and academic administrator
 Michael Hough (bishop), Australian Anglican bishop
 William Hough (bishop) (1859–1934), Anglican Bishop

Sportspeople
 Albert Hough (1877–1960), English bowls player
 Bevin Hough (1929–2019), New Zealand sportsman
 Billy Hough (footballer) (1908–unknown), Welsh professional footballer
 Charles Hough Jr. (born 1934), American equestrian
 Charlie Hough (born 1948), American professional baseball player
 Christine Hough (born 1969), Canadian ice skater
 Cliff Hough (1913–2003), Australian rules footballer
 Fred Hough (born 1935),  English footballer
 Gerald Hough (1894–1959), English cricketer
 Harry Hough, (1883–1935), American professional basketball player and coach
 Keith Hough (1908–1958),  Australian rules footballer
 Jim Hough (born 1956), American football player
 Ken Hough (1928–2009), Australia cricketer and association football player
 Larry Hough (born 1944), American rower
 Lauren Hough (born 1977), American equestrian
 Mike Hough (born 1963), Canadian professional ice hockey player
 Nicholas Hough (born 1993), Australian sprinter and hurdler
 Philip Hough (1924–2014), English cricketer
 Stanley M. Hough (born 1948), American Thoroughbred horse racing trainer
 Ted Hough (1899–1978), English footballer
 Willie Hough (1892–1976), Irish hurler

Scientists and physicians
 Franklin B. Hough (1822–1885), American scientist and historian
 George W. Hough (1836-1909), American astronomer
 James Hough (born 1945), Scottish physicist
 Richard R. Hough (1917–1992), American electrical engineer
 Romeyn Beck Hough (1857–1924), American botanist and physician
 Susan Hough (born 1961), American seismologist
 Sydney Samuel Hough (1870–1923), British applied mathematician and astronomer
 Theodore Hough (1865–1924), American physician
 Walter Hough (1859–1935), American ethnologist

Other
 Edward Hough (1879–1952), British trade unionist
 Halley Brewster Savery Hough (1894–1967), American curator at Washington University
 James Jackson Hough (1945–2019), American businessman and philanthropist
 Jerry F. Hough (c. 1935 – c. 2016), American professor of political science
 William R. Hough, American investment banker and benefactor of the University of Florida

English-language surnames